Stadio Enrico Rocchi is a multi-use stadium in Viterbo, Italy.  It is currently used mostly for football matches and is the home ground of Viterbese Castrense. The stadium holds 5,460.

External links
Stadio Enrico Rocchi at Soccerway

Enrico Rocchi
U.S. Viterbese 1908